Lepenica is a village in Mačva District, Central Serbia, Serbia.

References

Populated places in Mačva District